Regulator of G-protein signalling 9, also known as RGS9, is a human gene, which codes for a protein involved in regulation of signal transduction inside cells. Members of the RGS family, such as RGS9, are signaling proteins that suppress the activity of G proteins by promoting their deactivation.[supplied by OMIM]

There are two splice isoforms of RGS9 with quite different properties and patterns of expression. RGS9-1 is mainly found in the eye and is involved in regulation of phototransduction in rod and cone cells of the retina, while RGS9-2 is found in the brain, and regulates dopamine and opioid signaling in the basal ganglia.

RGS9-2 is of particular interest as the most important RGS protein involved in terminating signalling by the mu opioid receptor (although RGS4 and RGS17 are also involved), and is thought to be important in the development of tolerance to opioid drugs. RGS9-deficient mice exhibit some motor and cognitive difficulties however, so inhibition of this protein is likely to cause similar side effects.

RGS9 is differentially regulated by Guanine nucleotide-binding protein subunit beta-5 (GNB5) via the DEP domain and DEP helical-extension domain in protein stability and membrane anchor association.

References

Further reading

External links